Maev Kennedy (born 1954) is an Irish journalist. She has worked as a staff news writer for The Guardian and writes regularly for the Museums Journal. At The Guardian, she edited the diary column and been the arts and heritage correspondent and has written on archaeology.

Biography
Kennedy's mother was the novelist Val Mulkerns, herself the daughter of the Irish revolutionary Jimmy (J.J.) Mulkerns, who was interned his involvement in the Four Courts during the Easter Rising in 1916. Her father Maurice Kennedy was a short story writer. Their daughter was born in Dublin and attended University College Dublin (UCD) before joining The Irish Times, where she became the newspaper's parliamentary sketch writer.

Career
Kennedy is the author of the Hamlyn History of Archaeology. She broadcasts for the BBC, regularly presenting the Open Book programme on BBC Radio 4 and contributed to the Saturday Review programme. She is a Fellow of the Society of Antiquaries of London.

Bibliography
 The History of Archaeology (1998) 
 Hamlyn History of Archaeology (Spanish Edition) (1998)

References

External links 

 

1954 births
Living people
Alumni of University College Dublin
BBC Radio 4 presenters
Fellows of the Society of Antiquaries of London
Journalists from Dublin (city)
The Guardian journalists
The Irish Times people